Where We Live is the award-winning flagship news and talk program for WNPR (Connecticut Public Radio). The program is hosted by Lucy Nalpathanchil.   Where We Live was originally created by John Dankosky in 2006.  The show format includes live listener participation through phone and social media as well as long form interviews. It has been honored three times nationally as "Best Call-in Show" by PRNDI (Public Radio News Directors Inc.) and won a Gracie Award in 2020.

Featured Guests
Where We Live has included numerous local and national guests such as Connecticut Governor Dannel Malloy, retired NBA player, Jason Collins, Connecticut Senators Chris Murphy and Richard Blumenthal, Neil DeGrasse Tyson, Dave Brubeck, Gloria Steinem, United States ambassador Robert Ford and others.

References

Mass media in Connecticut